Speculum Principis (A mirror of Princes) was a guide to "proper princely behaviour" written by John Skelton in August 1501. Skelton was a well-known poet and had been appointed as tutor to Henry VII's second son, Prince Henry, who would later reign as Henry VIII of England. A copy is now in the British Museum, which may or may not be exactly the same as the one given to Henry.

References

See also
Mirrors for princes
 
1501 books
Henry VIII